Castelnau-Tursan is a commune in the Landes department in Nouvelle-Aquitaine in southwestern France.

The wines of the surrounding countryside are known under the name Tursan.

Population

See also
Communes of the Landes department

References

Communes of Landes (department)